Austin D. Alvord (April 1843 – December 3, 1924) was a Michigan politician.

Political life
He was elected on April 7, 1902, as the Mayor of City of Flint for the first of two one-year terms. In 1910, he ran again for mayor but was defeated by Republican Guy W. Selby.

References

1843 births
1924 deaths
Mayors of Flint, Michigan
Michigan Democrats
Burials in Michigan
20th-century American politicians